Mallika Dua (born 18 July 1989) is an Indian comedian, actress and writer. The comedian shot to fame with the viral video of Shit People Say: Sarojini Nagar Edition, which was written, styled and enacted by Dua herself. She is the daughter of Padma Shri recipient Indian journalist Vinod Dua.

Early life 
Dua was schooled at the Modern School, Barakhamba Road, New Delhi. She is half-Saraiki and half-Tamil. The inspiration for her short videos on social media are from Delhi. She is also a theater major from Franklin and Marshall College in the US. Her advertising career started as a trainee at McCain Erickson and later at Contract Advertising. She said that studying was never her cup of tea. She has always been funny and notorious since childhood.

She was exposed to media early since her father, Vinod Dua is a veteran journalist and a consulting editor at The Wire. Her father insisted that she and her sister should train in classical music and she started her music lessons when she was four. But she also said that she never imagined music as her career.

Career 
From August 2016, Dua moved to Mumbai formally to be a full-time entertainer. She launched her own YouTube channel in 2017 and had been frequently collaborating with All India Bakchod before the channel got itself in trouble around October 2018 in the Indian #MeToo allegations   .  Mallika has appeared in the first episode of Girliyapa with comedian Amukurajah, Why Should Hot Girls Have All the Fun?  and in the Bindass web series The Trip. She also made a special appearance in Saket Chaudhary's Hindi Medium sharing screen space with Irrfan Khan in 2017. She played a true blue Punjabi girl in the film quite similar to her real life personality. In September 2017, she appeared as one of the three mentors along with Zakir Khan and Hussain Dalal for the fifth season of The Great Indian Laughter Challenge which is judged by the actor Akshay Kumar. In 2018, she appeared in Namaste England as Harpreet. She is also seen in Trip 2 web series as Nazia. She also appeared in Zero alongside Shah Rukh Khan in the same year. When she lost her father, Vinod Dua, she penned a note where she mentioned that people said "nazar lag gayi hai logon ki (people have cast evil eye on you.).” She also said that she felt empty but turning to humor gave a voice to her emptiness.

Activism 
Dua's videos are satirical in nature depicting the harsh reality of the society with a dash of humour. She strongly believes in the cause of Feminism and uses her social networking platforms as a tool for women's empowerment and for also expressing her liberal ideologies and open-minded opinions on social causes and issues concerning women. She has actively voiced her opinion against sexual harassment of women at workplace, casual sexism among others. She was also one of the pioneers of the social media movement Me Too (Hashtag) where she was one of the first known faces to recount her own experience of being sexually harassed as a child to encourage her fan following (both men and women) to share their experiences as well and to stand up for the cause. she has also defied gender stereotypes through her videos and hashtag activism slamming body-shaming, fat-shaming carving a niche for herself in the industry inspiring the youth.

Films

Web series

References 

Living people
1989 births
Indian women comedians
Indian feminists